Jon Ander Lambea Aranguiz (born 15 August 1973) is a Spanish retired footballer who played as a left back, and is the current manager of SD Leioa.

Playing career
Lambea was born in Bilbao, Biscay, Basque Country, and was an Athletic Bilbao youth graduate. He made his senior debut with the reserves on 20 September 1992, starting in a 0–1 Segunda División away loss against UE Lleida.

Lambea made his first team – and La Liga – debut on 22 November 1992, playing the full 90 minutes in a 1–1 home draw against Real Burgos CF. He continued to switch between both first and reserve teams until the end of his spell, and moved to Almería CF in the second division in 1996.

Lambea suffered relegation with the Andalusians in 1997, and moved to CD Ourense in the following year; he would, however, suffer the same fate in 1999. In 2000 he agreed to a contract with CD Leganés, still in the second tier.

After three years as a regular starter, free agent Lambea signed for fellow league team SD Eibar on 6 August 2003. The following year he left the club, and subsequently returned to Almería.

Lambea retired in 2006, aged 32, after a one-season spell with Segunda División B side Zalla UC.

Managerial career
Lambea began his coaching career in 2007, taking care of Lagun Artea KE's youth setup. After spells with clubs in his native region, he returned to his first club Athletic in 2012, as a youth team manager.

On 5 July 2017, Lambea was appointed manager of SD Leioa in the third division. In his first season with Leioa the team finished in the 10th position among 20 teams in Segunda División B, Group 2.

Managerial statistics

References

External links

1973 births
Living people
Spanish footballers
Footballers from Bilbao
Association football defenders
La Liga players
Segunda División players
Segunda División B players
Bilbao Athletic footballers
Athletic Bilbao footballers
UD Almería players
CD Ourense footballers
Elche CF players
CD Leganés players
SD Eibar footballers
Zalla UC footballers
Spain under-21 international footballers
Spanish football managers